Maine Township is one of seventeen townships in Grundy County, Illinois, USA.  As of the 2010 census, its population was 330 and it contained 120 housing units.

Geography

Cities, towns, villages
 Coal City (southwest edge)

Unincorporated towns
 Gorman at 
 Harrisonville at 
(This list is based on USGS data and may include former settlements.)

Major highways
  Interstate 55

Airports and landing strips
 Matteson RLA Airport

Demographics

School districts
 Coal City Community Unit School District 1

Political districts
 Illinois' 11th congressional district
 State House District 75
 State Senate District 38

References
 
 United States Census Bureau 2007 TIGER/Line Shapefiles
 United States National Atlas

External links
 City-Data.com
 Illinois State Archives

Townships in Grundy County, Illinois
Townships in Illinois
1898 establishments in Illinois